Tricholaema is a bird genus in the African barbet family Lybiidae. It was formerly included with the New World barbets in the family Capitonidae and sometimes also in the Ramphastidae.

The genus Tricholaema was introduced by the French brothers Jules and Édouard Verreaux in 1855 with the hairy-breasted barbet (Tricholaema hirsuta) as the type species. The generic name combines the Ancient Greek thrix meaning hair and laimos meaning "throat".

The genus contains the following six species:

References

 
Bird genera
Barbets
Taxonomy articles created by Polbot